Ralph Waldo Gwinn (March 29, 1884 – February 27, 1962) was a Republican member of the United States House of Representatives from New York.

Gwinn was born in Noblesville, Indiana. He graduated from DePauw University in 1905 and Columbia University Law School in 1908. He served as a special representative of the Secretary of War in the European theatre of World War I. He was president of the Bronxville, New York board of education from 1920 until 1930. He was elected to Congress in 1944 and served from January 3, 1945, until January 3, 1959. Gwinn voted in favor of the Civil Rights Act of 1957. He died in Delray Beach, Florida. He is buried at Pawling Cemetery in Pawling, New York.

References

Sources

1884 births
1962 deaths
DePauw University alumni
Columbia Law School alumni
Old Right (United States)
Republican Party members of the United States House of Representatives from New York (state)
20th-century American politicians
School board members in New York (state)